Little Barefoot Soul is an album by American jazz pianist Bobby Timmons recorded in 1964 and released on the Prestige label.

Reception
The AllMusic review by Jason Ankeny awarded the album 4 stars stating "the album is a marvel of instinct and ingenuity. The music crackles with the energy of creation".

Track listing
All compositions by Bobby Timmons except as indicated
 "A Little Barefoot Soul"5:06
 "Walkin'-Wadin'-Sittin'-Ridin7:55
 "Little One"3:55
 "Cut Me Loose Charlie"4:49
 "Ain't Thinkin' 'Bout It"8:53
 "Nobody Knows the Trouble I've Seen" (Traditional)2:28
Recorded at Rudy Van Gelder Studio in Englewood Cliffs, New Jersey on June 18, 1964.

Personnel
Bobby Timmonspiano
Sam Jonesbass (1–5)
Ray Lucasdrums (1–5)

References

Prestige Records albums
Bobby Timmons albums
1964 albums
Albums produced by Ozzie Cadena
Albums recorded at Van Gelder Studio